Jason Polak (born 9 January 1968) is an Australian former association football player.

Playing career

Club career
Polak began his National Soccer League career with Sydney Olympic in 1989 after having spent three years at the Australian Institute of Sport. In the 1989/90 season, Polak spent time with Greek club Panathinaikos. He played as a centre midfielder and left midfielder. He also played as an attacker.

International career
In 1985, Polak was selected for an Australian Schoolboys team to tour the United Kingdom, however he did not tour.

In 1987, Polak played three matches for the Australia national under-20 football team at the 1987 FIFA World Youth Championship.

Polak made his debut for the Australia national association football team in 1988 against Fiji in Newcastle. He played his last match in 1996 in Australia's defeat of Tahiti in the second leg of the 1996 OFC Nations Cup final in Canberra.

In 1989, Polak made three appearances for the Australia national futsal team at the 1989 FIFA Futsal World Championship.

|}

References

Living people
1968 births
Australian soccer players
Australia international soccer players
Australian Institute of Sport soccer players
Australian people of Polish descent
Association football midfielders
1996 OFC Nations Cup players